Gwendolyn Elizabeth Boyd (born December 27, 1955) is an American scientist and university administrator. She served as president of Alabama State University from 2014 to 2016, and was previously national president of the Delta Sigma Theta sorority from 2000 to 2004. Before entering administration she worked as a mechanical engineer at the Johns Hopkins University Applied Physics Laboratory.

Early life
Boyd was born in Montgomery, Alabama, the daughter of single mother Dora Lee McClain. She was orphaned at the age of 13, and then raised by her godmother, Emzella Mapson. Boyd was one of the first five black students to attend Jefferson Davis High School, where she excelled in science and mathematics. She graduated valedictorian in 1973. Boyd won a scholarship to Alabama State University, where she graduated in 1977 with a Bachelor of Science in mathematics. She went on to Yale University, in 1979 graduating with a Master of Science degree in mechanical engineering (specializing in acoustics). She was the only woman and the only black person in her program at Yale. After graduating, she briefly worked for IBM in Kingston, New York.

Johns Hopkins
In 1980, Boyd joined the Johns Hopkins Applied Physics Laboratory (APL) in Laurel, Maryland. She initially worked in the laboratory's Strategic Systems Department, testing and evaluating submarine navigation systems. In 1998, Boyd moved into administration and was responsibility for the APL's development programs. She was also appointed to Johns Hopkins' Diversity Leadership Council, serving as chair from 2003 to 2005. From 2000 to 2004, Boyd served as national president of Delta Sigma Theta sorority. In 2009, the Obama Administration appointed her to the board of the Barry M. Goldwater Scholarship foundation.

Alabama State
In December 2013, Boyd's alma mater Alabama State University announced that she had been appointed as the university's next president, with a term beginning in February 2014. She became the first woman to hold the position. Her new contract contained a clause granting her right of residency in the president's house, but only if she did not "cohabitate with any person with whom she has a romantic relation", which attracted some public attention.

In November 2016, Boyd's presidency was suspended by the ASU board of trustees, at a meeting which had initially been called to discuss the university's budget. The following month, the board voted 8–6 to terminate her contract, citing "failure to maintain the confidence of the board".

References

1955 births
Heads of universities and colleges in the United States
Women heads of universities and colleges
People from Montgomery, Alabama
African-American academics
American mechanical engineers
Yale School of Engineering & Applied Science alumni
Alabama State University alumni
Alabama State University faculty
Johns Hopkins University faculty
Living people
American academic administrators
21st-century African-American people
20th-century African-American people